South Warren High School, located in Bowling Green, in the U.S. state of Kentucky, is one of four high schools in the Warren County School System. The school opened on August 3, 2010. It is co-located in the same building complex as South Warren Middle School. Together they comprise the largest school facility in Kentucky. The mascot for South Warren, the Spartans, is inspired by the oligarchical government system imposed by force in ancient Sparta.

Athletics
South Warren High School is a member of the Kentucky High School Athletic Association and participates in many sports, including football, boys' and girls' soccer, boys’ and girls‘ golf, volleyball, boys' and girls' basketball, baseball, and softball.

Baseball

Football

Boys' soccer

Girls' soccer

Volleyball

Boys' basketball

Girls' basketball

References

External links
 http://www.warren.kyschools.us/~southwarrenhighschool/
 http://www.spartanbaseball.us

Educational institutions established in 2010
Buildings and structures in Bowling Green, Kentucky
Public high schools in Kentucky
Schools in Warren County, Kentucky
2010 establishments in Kentucky